Area codes 903 and 430 are telephone area codes in the North American Numbering Plan (NANP) for the northeastern part of the U.S. state of Texas, including Texarkana, Tyler, and Sherman. The numbering plan area begins just north and east of the Dallas–Fort Worth metroplex, and extends to the Oklahoma, Arkansas, and Louisiana state borders. Area code 903 was created November 4, 1990 in a split of area code 214. Area code 430 was assigned to the same service area on February 15, 2003 in creation of an overlay. Before October 18, 1980, area code 903 was assigned to an area in northwestern Mexico.

History
From 1962 until October 18, 1980, area code 903 was an area code for parts of northwestern Mexico served by Telefónica Fronteriza, which homed on AT&T lines in the United States rather than Telefonos de Mexico (Telmex). Telmex and the Mexican government forcibly acquired the TF exchanges, and in 1980, Telmex reorganized the area codes of the country, assigning 6 as the initial digit of 8-digit numbers in the northwest.  At this point, 903 was withdrawn from use and replaced with area code 706, as one of two area codes for alternative dialing into certain parts of Mexico from the United States. The other area code used for this was 905. 706 and 905 were dial-around codes that replaced +52(5) for Mexico City and +52(6) for northwestern Mexico. In February 1991, 706 and 905 were withdrawn pending assignment within the NANP service area.

Service area
Counties served by the area codes:
Anderson, Bowie, Camp, Cass, Cherokee, Delta, Fannin, Franklin, Freestone, Grayson, Gregg, Harrison, Henderson, Hill, Hopkins, Hunt, Kaufman, Lamar, Leon, Madison, Marion, Morris, Navarro, Panola, Rains, Red River, Rusk, Smith, Titus, Upshur, Van Zandt, and Wood

Towns and cities served by the overlay: 
Alba, Annona, Arp, Arthur City, Athens, Atlanta, Avery, Avinger, Bagwell, Bailey, Barry, Beckville, Bells, Ben Franklin, Ben Wheeler, Big Sandy, Bivins, Bloomburg, Blooming Grove, Blossom, Bogata, Bonham, Brashear, Brookston, Buffalo, Bullard, Caddo Mills, Campbell, Canton, Carthage, Cason, Cayuga, Celeste, Centerville, Chatfield, Chicota, Clarksville, Clayton, Coffee City, Collinsville, Commerce, Como, Cookville, Cooper, Corsicana, Cumby, Cuney, Cunningham, Daingerfield, De Berry, De Kalb, Denison, Deport, Detroit, Dew, Diana, Dike, Dodd City, Douglassville, Easton, Ector, Edgewood, Elkhart, Elysian Fields, Emory, Enloe, Eustace, Fairfield, Flint, Frankston, Frost, Fruitvale, Gallatin, Gary City, Gilmer, Gober, Golden, Gordonville, Grand Saline, Greenville, Gunter, Hawkins, Henderson, Honey Grove, Hooks, Howe, Ivanhoe, Jacksonville, Jefferson, Jewett, Joinerville, Jonesville, Judson, Karnack, Kemp, Kildare, Kilgore, Kirvin, Klondike, Ladonia, Laird Hill, Lake Creek, Laneville, Larue, Leesburg, Leona, Leonard, Lindale, Linden, Lodi, Lone Oak, Lone Star, Long Branch, Longview, Mabank, Marietta, Marquez, Marshall, Maud, Maydelle, McLeod, Merit, Mertens, Midway, Minden, Mineola, Mount Enterprise, Mount Pleasant, Mount Vernon, Naples, Nash, Neches, New Boston, New London, New Summerfield, Oakwood, Omaha, Ore City, Overton, Palestine, Panola, Paris, Pattonville, Pecan Gap, Petty, Pickton, Pittsburg, Point, Pottsboro, Powderly, Powell, Poynor, Price, Purdon, Queen City, Quinlan, Quitman, Randolph, Ravenna, Redwater, Rice, Richland, Roxton, Sadler, Saltillo, Savoy, Scottsville, Scroggins, Selman City, Sherman, Simms, Southmayd, Streetman, Sulphur Bluff, Sulphur Springs, Sumner, Talco, Tatum, Telephone, Tennessee Colony, Texarkana, Tom Bean, Trenton, Tyler, Union Valley, Van Alstyne, Van, Waskom, White Oak, Whitehouse, Whitesboro, Whitewright, Windom, Winfield, Winona, Wolfe City, Woodlawn, and  Yantis

See also
List of Texas area codes

References

Area codes in the United States
Area codes in Texas